Crematogaster ampla is a species of ant in tribe Crematogastrini. It was described by Powell in 2014.

References

ampla
Insects described in 2014